Cataract Falls is a waterfall located in northern Owen County in the west central part of the U.S. state of Indiana. The largest waterfall by volume in the state, it is part of the Lieber State Recreation Area.

Both falls consist of a series of drops.

Immediately downstream of the Lower Falls, Mill Creek enters the southern end of Cagles Mill Lake, near the towns of Cunot and Cataract. The falls are just off State Road 42 and close to State Road 243.

References

External links
Geographic Names Information System Feature Detail Reports:

Great Lakes Waterfalls and Beyond: Cataract Falls
Cataract Falls Owen County Indiana

Landforms of Owen County, Indiana
Waterfalls of Indiana